

Martin Strahammer (13 November 1890 – 2 May 1945) was an Austrian general in the armed forces of Nazi Germany during World War II. He was a recipient of the  Knight's Cross of the Iron Cross with Oak Leaves. Following his surrender, he was shot by American forces on 2 May 1945 at Parma under unclear circumstances.

Awards and decorations
 Iron Cross (1914) 2nd Class (8 September 1917)
 Iron Cross (1939)  2nd Class (4 July 1941) & 1st Class (5 August 1941)
 German Cross in Gold on 11 March 1943 as Oberst in Grenadier-Regiment 266
 Knight's Cross of the Iron Cross with Oak Leaves
 Knight's Cross on 30 January 1942 as Oberstleutnant and commander of Panzer-Jäger-Abteilung 240
 Oak Leaves on 11 August 1944 as Oberst and commander of Grenadier-Regiment 146

References

Citations

Bibliography

 
 
 

1890 births
1945 deaths
Military personnel from Graz
Major generals of the German Army (Wehrmacht)
Austro-Hungarian military personnel of World War I
Recipients of the clasp to the Iron Cross, 2nd class
Recipients of the Gold German Cross
Recipients of the Knight's Cross of the Iron Cross with Oak Leaves
World War II prisoners of war held by the United States
Austrian prisoners of war
Prisoners who died in United States military detention
Austro-Hungarian Army officers
German Army personnel killed in World War II
Deaths by firearm in Italy